Hollola TV Mast is a television mast in Hollola, Finland built in 1967. It has a height of 327 metres (1073 feet). It is also the tallest structure in Finland.

See also
List of tallest structures in Finland

Notes

Towers completed in 1967
Communication towers in Finland
Transmitter sites in Finland
TV Mast
1967 establishments in Finland